José Alejandro Bernales Ramírez (January 29, 1949 – May 29, 2008) was the General director of the Carabineros de Chile from November 27, 2005 until his death on May 29, 2008. He was also the first President of Ameripol. He died in a helicopter crash in Panama City along with three other police officials, two spouses, and five Panamanians. After his death he was called "The People's General". He was replaced by Eduardo Gordon. His wife Teresa Bianchini also died in the incident.

References

External links
 

1949 births
2008 deaths
Chilean police officers
Victims of aviation accidents or incidents in Panama
Victims of helicopter accidents or incidents